A supermarket is a large form of the traditional grocery store, a self-service shop offering a wide variety of food and household products organized into aisles.

Supermarket may also refer to:

 Supermarket (comics), a four-issue 2006 comic written by Brian Wood and illustrated by Kristian Donaldson
 Supermarket (film), a 1974 West German crime film
 Supermarket (Logic album), a 2019 soundtrack album by Logic, or the title track, or the accompanying novel
 Supermarket (Rockfour album), a 2000 music album by Rockfour, or the title track
 Supermarket (Stakka Bo album), a 1993 music album by Stakka Bo

See also 

 SuperMercado!, a 1998 album by 2 Skinnee J’s